The FIS Ski Flying World Ski Championships 2006 took place on 12–15 January 2006 in Bad Mitterndorf, Austria (The International Ski Federation has location listed as Kulm, the ski jumping venue located in Bad Mitterndorf.) for the fourth time. Bad Mitterndorf hosted the championships previously in 1975, 1986, and 1996. Norway repeated as team champion while Roar Ljøkelsøy repeated as individual champion. A record four nations won medals.

Individual
13-14 January 2006.

Morgenstern had the longest jump of the competition with a 210.5 m final round jump. Widhölzl led after the first round, but Ljøkelsøy took the lead after the second round and ensured his victory.

Team
15 January 2006.

Slovenia's Robert Kranjec had the longest jumps in both rounds of competition at 207.0 m. Slovenia would unfortunately finish fifth because none of his other teammate could go further than 180.5 m.

Medal table

References

FIS Ski Flying World Championships
2006 in ski jumping
2006 in Austrian sport
Skiing competitions in Austria
International sports competitions hosted by Austria
January 2006 sports events in Europe
Sport in Styria